The GMC V6 is a family of 60-degree V6 engines produced by the GMC division of General Motors from 1959 through 1974. It was developed into both gasoline and diesel versions, and produced in V8 and V12 derivatives. Examples of this engine family were found in pickup trucks, Suburbans, heavier trucks and motor coaches.

A big block engine, variants were produced in 305, 351, 401 and 478 cubic-inch (5.0, 5.8, 6.6, and 7.8 respectively liter) displacements, with considerable parts commonality. During the latter years of production,  versions with enlarged crankshaft journals were manufactured as well.

GMC produced a  60° V8 with a single cam shaft using the same general layout (bore and stroke) as the 478 V6. The 637 V8 was the largest displacement production gasoline V8 ever made for highway trucks.

The largest engine derived from the series was a  "Twin Six" V12, which had a unique block and crankshaft, but shared many exterior parts with the 351.

Diesel versions of the 351, 478 and 637, advertised as the ToroFlow, were also manufactured. These engines had no relationship to the well-known Detroit Diesel two-stroke diesel engines produced by General Motors during the same time period.

All versions of the GMC V6 used a six-throw crankshaft, which when combined with the 60 degree included cylinder angle, produced a smooth running engine without any need for a balance shaft. Spark plugs were located on the inboard side of the cylinder heads and were accessed from the top of the engine. This position allowed for shorter spark plug wires and kept the spark plugs away from the hot exhaust manifolds, something which was emphasized in sales literature. It was also perceived as easier to access them for maintenance. These GMC V6 engines were noted for durability, ease of maintenance and strong low RPM torque.

In 1974, GMC discontinued the V6 engine; all gas-engine models were powered by Chevrolet straight-six and V8 engines while diesel engines were dropped from medium duty models and would not return until 1976.

305
The  305 had a  bore and stroke. The 305A was equipped with a single barrel carburetor and produced  gross at 3600 rpm and  gross at 1600 rpm (measured without air cleaner or accessories in an ideal environment).  The 305E was equipped with a two barrel carburetor and produced  gross at 4000 rpm and  gross at 1600 rpm in 1969.

The 305 was GMC's standard pickup truck and Suburban engine from 1960 to 1974. The 305A was standard in 1000–3500 series trucks in 1960-1961 and was dropped in 1962. The 305D was an option in the 1000–3500 series in 1961 and became standard in 1962, replacing the 305A. The 305E replaced the 305D in the 1000–3500 series trucks in 1963 and was used until 1969. The 305B and 305C (a 305B with a different manifold and carburetor) were used in 4000 and 5000 series trucks; the 305B was dropped in 1962 while the 305C continued to 1974.

351
The  351  had a  bore and stroke. The 351C produced  gross at 3600 rpm and  gross at 1600 rpm, while the 305M produced  gross at 3700 rpm and  gross at 1400 rpm in 1969. Introduced in 1960, the 351 was available as a C series, an E series (351E), and Magnum series (351M). The E and M series featured a larger two-barrel carburetor and an open port intake, bigger intake and exhaust ports, larger diameter valves, and larger exhaust manifolds. The 351E did not use the same parts as the 305E.  

The 351 or 351C were used in some 4000, 5000, and 6000 series trucks from 1962 to 1972 and the 351E was used in the 1000–3500 series trucks from 1966 to 1969. The 351, 351C and 351M engines were medium duty truck engines, while the 351E was a light-duty engine - basically a 351M without the oil-driven governors. In 1973, the 351 was replaced by the 379 cubic inch V6.

379
The  379 had a  bore and stroke. It produced  net at 3600 rpm and  net torque at 1600 rpm. The 379 was a 351 with a 478 crankshaft.

401
The  401 had a  bore and stroke.

It produced  gross at 3400 rpm and  gross torque at 1400 rpm while the Magnum version introduced in 1966 produced  gross at 4000 RPM and  gross torque at 1600 RPM. The engine was further enlargement of the  351 and was produced from 1960 through 1972. This engine was used in the 5500 and 6000 series as well as the H-5000; it was an option in the W-5000 and SP-5000.

432
The  432 had a  bore and stroke. In 1973 & 1974 It produced  net at 3200 RPM and  net torque at 1600 RPM in 1973. There was also a version with enlarged crankshaft journals. The 432 was a 401 with a 478 crankshaft.  The 432 was a Magnum engine though it was never designated as such.

478
The  478 had a  bore and stroke. It produced  net at 3200 rpm and  net at 1400 rpm. It was one of the largest V6 engines ever built. It was introduced in 1962 for the 6500 series trucks.

702
The  V12 "Twin Six" had a  bore and stroke. It produced  gross at 2400 rpm and  gross at 1600 rpm in 1965.

It was offered in 1960 for the 7000 series trucks, and as a special order option in Canada. It was its own separate engine design, based on a single casting, which had four exhaust manifolds, two carburetors and intake manifolds, and two distributor caps driven by a single distributor drive, plus other parts from the 351 V6. A total of 56 major parts are interchangeable between the Twin-Six and the other GMC V6 engines to provide greater parts availability and standardization. It produced  horsepower. The 702 was in production until 1966, when it was replaced by the 637 V8.

See also
 GMC straight-6 engine
 GMC V8 engine
 List of GM engines
 1960-1966 GMC Truck Club

References

V6
V6 engines